Shahram Mehraban (born 16 November 1979) is an Iranian association football goalkeeper.

Club career

Club career statistics

References

Living people
1979 births
Iranian footballers
Association football goalkeepers
Persian Gulf Pro League players
Azadegan League players
Shahrdari Bandar Abbas players
Rah Ahan players
Saba players
Gahar Zagros players
Paykan F.C. players
People from Qazvin